Circinaria is a genus of crustose lichens in the family Megasporaceae. It was circumscribed by Johann Heinrich Friedrich Link in 1809.

Species
, Species Fungorum accepts 31 species of Circinaria:
Circinaria affinis 
Circinaria arida 
Circinaria caesiocinerea 
Circinaria calcarea 
Circinaria cerebroides 
Circinaria contorta 
Circinaria crespiana 
Circinaria cupreogrisea 
Circinaria deminuta  – Australia
Circinaria digitata 
Circinaria elmorei 
Circinaria emiliae 
Circinaria esculenta 
Circinaria fruticulosa 
Circinaria gibbosa 
Circinaria hispida 
Circinaria jussuffii 
Circinaria lacunosa 
Circinaria laxilobata 
Circinaria leprosescens 
Circinaria maculata 
Circinaria mansourii 
Circinaria ochraceoalba 
Circinaria rogeri 
Circinaria rostamii 
Circinaria schafeevii 
Circinaria scyphulifera  – Russia
Circinaria serenensis 
Circinaria subochracea 
Circinaria tominii 
Circinaria tortuosa 
Circinaria transbaicalica

References

Pertusariales
Pertusariales genera
Taxa described in 1809
Taxa named by Johann Heinrich Friedrich Link